From August 22, 2012 to March 27, 2013, the following skiing events took place at various locations around the world.

Alpine skiing

October 27, 2012 – March 17, 2013: FIS World Cup
Men's combined overall winners: both  Ivica Kostelić and  Alexis Pinturault were tied for first place.
Men's downhill overall winner:  Aksel Lund Svindal.
Men's giant slalom overall winner:  Ted Ligety.
Men's slalom overall winner:  Marcel Hirscher.
Men's Super G overall winner:  Aksel Lund Svindal.
Women's combined overall winner:  Tina Maze.
Women's downhill overall winner:  Lindsey Vonn.
Women's giant slalom overall winner:  Tina Maze.
Women's slalom overall winner:  Mikaela Shiffrin.
Women's Super G overall winner:  Tina Maze.
Ladies overall champion:  Tina Maze (first title).
Men's overall champion:  Marcel Hirscher (second consecutive title).
4–17 February: FIS Alpine World Ski Championships 2013 in Schladming, Austria
  won the gold medal count;  won the overall medal count.

Biathlon

 25 November 2012 – 17 March 2013: Biathlon World Cup
  is the winner of both gold and overall medal counts for this World Cup of events.
 7–17 February: The Biathlon World Championships 2013 was held at Nové Město na Moravě, Czech Republic.
  was the gold medal and overall medal counts winner.

Freestyle skiing

 August 22, 2012 – March 25, 2013: 2012–13 FIS Freestyle Skiing World Cup
Men's aerials overall winner:  Jia Zongyang
Men's halfpipe overall winner:  Mike Riddle
Men's moguls overall winner:  Mikaël Kingsbury
Men's skicross overall winner:  Alex Fiva
Men's slopestyle overall winner:  James Woods
Women's aerials overall winner:  Xu Mengtao
Women's halfpipe overall winner:  Virginie Faivre
Women's moguls overall winner:  Hannah Kearney
Women's skicross overall winner:  Fanny Smith
Women's slopestyle overall winner:  Keri Herman
Men's total overall winner:  Mikaël Kingsbury (first title).
Women's total overall winner:  Xu Mengtao (first title).
 March 5 – 10: The FIS Freestyle World Ski Championships 2013 took place at Voss, Norway

Nordic skiing

 23 November 2012 – 24 March 2013: FIS Ski Jumping World Cup
Ladies: . First overall title.
Men: . Second overall title.
24 November 2012 – 16 March 2013: FIS Nordic Combined World Cup
Men: . First overall title.
24 November 2012 – 24 March 2013: Fis Cross-Country World Cup
Men: . Second overall title.
Ladies: . Fourth overall title.
20 February – 3 March: FIS Nordic World Ski Championships 2013 in Val di Fiemme, Italy
 topped the gold and overall medals tally.

Snowboarding

 August 28, 2012 – March 27, 2013: 2012–13 FIS Snowboard World Cup
Men's Big Air overall winner:  Seppe Smits.
Men's halfpipe overall winner:  Scotty Lago.
Men's parallel slalom overall winner:  Andreas Prommegger.
Men's slopestyle overall winner:  Yuuki Kadano.
Men's snowboard cross overall winner:  Alex Pullin.
Women's halfpipe overall winner:  Kelly Clark.
Women's parallel slalom overall winner:  Patrizia Kummer.
Women's slopestyle overall winner:  Kjersti Buaas.
Women's snowboard cross overall winner:  Dominique Maltais.
Men's total overall winner:  Janne Korpi (first title).
Women's total overall winner:  Kelly Clark (first title).
 18–27 January: The FIS Snowboarding World Championships 2013 took place at the Stoneham Mountain Resort, in Stoneham-et-Tewkesbury, Quebec, Canada
 and  both tied in the gold and overall medal tallies. However, Canada takes first place because of the team's two silver medals won; Finland has two bronze medals instead.

References

External links
 International Ski Federation official website
 IPC Alpine Skiing official website
 International Biathlon Union official website
 IPC Biathlon and Cross Country Skiing official website

Skiing by year
Skiing
Skiing